Rudolf Hruska (2 July 1915 in Vienna – 4 December 1995 in Turin) was an Austrian automobile designer and engineer, most famous for his design of various Alfa Romeo cars.

After graduating Vienna University of Technology he worked for Magirus in Ulm (1935–38) and Porsche in Stuttgart (1938–45), developing the Kdf-Wagen (1939) and VK 4501 (P) tank (1943).  In Meran he and Carlo Abarth established a Porsche dealership (1945), and shortly after joined Piero Dusio in the Turin-based Cisitalia racing car project (1946–49).  Hruska joined Finmeccanica (1951–54), consulting on the Alfa Romeo 1900.  At Alfa Romeo (1954–59) he assisted Orazio Satta Puliga in the Alfa Romeo Giulietta, before joining Simca and Fiat (1960–67), working on the Simca 1000 and Fiat 124/Fiat 128.  Hruska then designed the Alfa Romeo Alfasud and established the new Alfa Romeo Pomigliano d'Arco plant near Naples (1967–73).  Since then he was in a design firm in Arese (1974–80) and at I.DE.A Institute in Turin (1980-).

References

Austrian automobile designers
Engineers from Vienna
Alfa Romeo people
TU Wien alumni
1915 births
1995 deaths
Austrian expatriates in Italy